Leucanopsis oruba is a moth of the family Erebidae. It was described by William Schaus in 1892. It is found in Colombia and Brazil.

References

oruba
Moths described in 1892